Unless is a Canadian-Irish drama film, which premiered at the 2016 Toronto International Film Festival. Based on the novel Unless by Carol Shields, the film was directed by Alan Gilsenan.

The film stars Catherine Keener as Reta, a successful writer struggling to deal with her daughter Norah's (Hannah Gross) decision to drop out of college and live on the streets. The cast also includes Brendan Coyle, Matt Craven, Chloe Rose, Hanna Schygulla, Martha Henry, Linda Kash, Yanna McIntosh, and Kathryn Greenwood.

References

External links

2016 films
English-language Canadian films
English-language Irish films
Canadian drama films
Irish drama films
Films based on Canadian novels
Films based on American novels
2010s English-language films
2010s Canadian films